The Paraw Regatta Festival or Iloilo Paraw Regatta Festival is an annual festival held every third weekend of February in the Villa de Arevalo district, Iloilo City, Philippines. Its main event is a sailboat race in Iloilo Strait that features the paraw, a Visayan double-outrigger sail boat. It is the oldest traditional craft event in Asia, and the largest sailing event in the Philippines. It is one of Iloilo City's tourism events along with the Dinagyang Festival, Kasadyahan Festival, Chinese New Year festival and La Candelaria Fiesta (Fiesta de la Candelaria). The Iloilo Paraw Regatta began as a half-day sailboat race but is now a multi-day, multi-event festival.

Participating paraws are categorized based on the waterline length of the boat and further classified according to their sails as "unpainted" or "painted". The sails are painted with colorful designs.

The racing breaks down into two classes. Boats of length 16 ft and below of strictly traditional construction and those 16 ft 1 inch through to 22 ft with a wider range of materials allowed.

The first race started in 1973 with the mission to preserve the historic value of the paraws.

Side events
 Iloilo Paraw Slalom 
 Miss Iloilo Paraw Regatta 
 Pinta de Layag Competition 
 Pinta Tawo Competition
 Miniature Paraw Race
 Rowing and Paddling Competition
 Governor's Cup Fishing Competition
 Samba de Regatta
 Beach Football Tournament
 Beach Volleyball Tournament
 Beach Ultimate Frisbee Tournament

References

External links

  of the Iloilo Paraw Regatta Foundation
 Map of the race course
 Racing rules and Boat Rules
 

Sports in Iloilo
Tourist attractions in Iloilo City
Sailing in Asia
Sports competitions in the Philippines